Speed skating at the 2023 Winter World University Games was held from 15 to 20 January 2023 at the James B. Sheffield Olympic Skating Rink.

Men's events

Women's events

Mixed events

Medal table

Participating nations

  (1)
  (8)
  (2)
  (2)
  (2)
  (2)
  (3)
  (4)
  (3)
  (17)
  (6)
  (1)
  (8)
  (12)
  (15)
  (4)
  (3)
  (7)

References

External links
Results book

2023 Winter World University Games
2023
Winter World University Games
2023 Winter World University Games